Podwalk was a mobile app that enables users to listen to audio recordings in which segments linked to places. It goes under the slogan "the site specific podcast player".
The app is available for iOS.

The app was released in November 2015 at the international competition Creative Business Cup, in which it won second prize.

Usage 

Podwalk can be used for creating location-based podcasts, like radio documentaries or dramas at places. Further it can be used for traditional audio guides at museums and tourist attractions. As of February 2016 it is featuring content by prominent cultural institutions such as Ibsen Museet, National Gallery of Denmark and Danish Architecture Centre.

Technology 

The app uses GPS for locating the audio outdoors and iBeacon technology for navigating at places with poor gps signal or for greater accuracy.

Development 

Podwalk is developed by designer Åsmund Sollihøgda, which previously had created the similar project Recho, an app that allows anyone to record audio snippets that is linked to locations using GPS coordinates.

References

External links

2016 software
IOS software
Podcasting software